Chris Braithwaite, also known as Chris Jones (1885 – 9 September 1944), was a black Barbadian who was leader of the Colonial Seamen's Association in the 1930s.

Life
Born in Barbados, Braithwaite went to sea with the British merchant navy as a teenager and travelled the world as a sailor. He then settled in Chicago and founded a family, before rejoining the Merchant Navy during World War I. After World War I he lived in New York City for a while, before moving to settle in London, working for the Shipping Federation. He married a white woman, Edna, from Stepney in London's East End, and they lived in Stepney.

Braithwaite became a member of the National Union of Seamen, and in 1930 joined the Seamen's Minority Movement, a rank-and-file group organised by the Communist Party of Great Britain (CPGB). Taking the pseudonym "Chris Jones" to avoid victimisation by his employer, Braithwaite had joined the CPGB by 1931. He helped distribute the Negro Worker, and with Arnold Ward helped launch the Negro Welfare Association, publicising the case of the Scottsboro Boys. In 1933 he followed George Padmore in resigning from the CPGB in protest at the implicit shift away from anti-imperialism involved with the emerging "Popular Front" strategy.

In 1935, opposing the new British Shipping (Assistance) Act 1935, Braithwaite founded the Colonial Seamen's Association - which included Asian seamen alongside other black colonial seamen. He became organising secretary of the International African Service Bureau (IASB), established in May 1937, whose members included Padmore, C. L. R. James, Jomo Kenyatta, Amy Ashwood Garvey and I. T. A. Wallace-Johnson. Braithwaite wrote a monthly column, "Seamen's Notes", for the IASB journal, International African Opinion. Braithwaite, Padmore and James continued to oppose the CPGB, turning up together to heckle CPGB meetings. Braithwaite and Padmore worked with the Independent Labour Party (ILP) and with ILP intellectuals like Reginald Reynolds and Ethel Mannin.

He died from pneumonia on 9 September 1944, survived by his wife and six children.

References

Further reading / external links 
Dorothy Rose du Boulay, Chris Braithwaite and the International African Service Bureau - talk by Chris Braithwaite's granddaughter at Rastafari in Motion, Black Cultural Archives, August 2016.  
Christian Høgsbjerg, Chris Braithwaite: Mariner, Renegade and Castaway (London: Socialist History Society / Redwords, 2014), 
Christian Høgsbjerg, "Chris M Braithwaite" Dictionary of Caribbean and Afro-Latin American Biography (Oxford: Oxford University Press, 2016).
"Black Salt: Britain's Black Sailors" – Exhibition at Merseyside Maritime Museum in Liverpool which featured Chris Braithwaite in 2017–18. 
A Necessary Fiction - art exhibition by Basil Olton in Tower Hamlets, London, in 2017–18 inspired by the life of Chris Braithwaite.

1885 births
1944 deaths
Barbadian emigrants to England
Barbadian emigrants to the United States
Barbadian sailors
Black British history
British communists
British Merchant Navy personnel
British trade unionists
Communist Party of Great Britain members